Before the Acts of Union 1707, the barons of the shire of Roxburgh (also called Teviotdale) elected commissioners to represent them in the unicameral Parliament of Scotland and in the Convention of the Estates. The number of commissioners was increased from two to four in 1690.

From 1708 Roxburghshire was represented by one Member of Parliament in the House of Commons of Great Britain.

List of shire commissioners

 1617 and 1621: Andrew Riddell of Riddell
 1628–33, 1646–47, 1650: Sir Walter Riddell of Riddell
 1639–41: Robert Pringle of Stichell
 1645, 1648–49, 1659: Sir Andrew Kerr of Greenhead
 1661–63: Sir Archibald Douglas of Caveria 
 1661–63, 1667 (convention), 1669–74: Sir Gilbert Eliott of Stobs
 1665 (convention): John Scot of Langshaw 
 1665 (convention), 1667 (convention): Harie McDowd 
 1669–74: Sir Andrew Kerr of Greenhead
 1678 (convention), 1681–82: Robert Pringle of Stichell
 1678 (convention), 1681–82: Henry McDougal of McCairston 
 1685–86, 1689 (convention), 1689–93: Patrick Scott of Ancrum (expelled)
 1685–86, 1702–07: Sir William Kerr of Greenhead
 1689 (convention), 1689–1693: Sir William Eliott of Stobs (expelled)
 1693–1702, 1702–07: Sir William Bennet of Grubbet
 1693–1702: John Scott of Wooll  
 1690–1700: Sir John Riddell of Riddell (died c.1700)
 1690–98: Sir William Douglas of Cavers, sheriff (died c.1698) 
 1698–1700: Sir James Scott of Galla   
 1700–02, 1702–07: Archibald Douglas, 13th of Cavers, sheriff
 1702-07 Sir Gilbert Elliot of Minto

References

See also
 List of constituencies in the Parliament of Scotland at the time of the Union

Constituencies of the Parliament of Scotland (to 1707)
Constituencies disestablished in 1707
1707 disestablishments in Scotland
Politics of the Scottish Borders
History of the Scottish Borders